The 2003 British Speedway Championship was the 43rd edition of the British Speedway Championship. The Final took place on 5 July at Arlington Stadium in Eastbourne, England. The Championship was won by Scott Nicholls, who beat Dean Barker, David Norris and Joe Screen in the final heat.

Final 
5 July 2003
 Eastbourne

{| width=100%
|width=50% valign=top|

Qualifying

Final

See also 
 British Speedway Championship

References 

British Speedway Championship
Great Britain